Attalus III Philometor Euergetes ( – 133 BC) was the last Attalid king of Pergamon, ruling from 138 BC to 133 BC.

Biography
Attalus III was the son of king Eumenes II and his queen Stratonice of Pergamon, and he was the nephew of Attalus II, whom he succeeded.  "Philometor Euergetes" means "Loving-his-Mother, Benefactor" in Greek; he was so-called because of his close relationship with his mother Stratonice. He is the likely addressee of a fragmentary hymn by the poet Nicander which celebrates his heritage.

According to Livy, Attalus III had little interest in ruling Pergamon, devoting his time to studying medicine, botany, gardening, and other pursuits. He had no male children or heirs of his own, and in his will he left his kingdom to the Roman Republic, believing that if he did not then Rome would take the kingdom anyway and this way would avoid bloodshed. Tiberius Gracchus requested that the treasury of Pergamon be opened up to the Roman public, but the Senate refused this.

Not everyone in Pergamon accepted Rome's rule. In 131 BC Aristonicus, who claimed to be Attalus' brother as well as the son of Eumenes II, an earlier king, led a popular uprising with the help of the Roman philosopher Blossius. He ruled as Eumenes III. The revolt was put down in 129 BC, and Pergamon was divided among Rome, Pontus, and Cappadocia.

Notes

References 
 Hansen, Esther V. (1971). The Attalids of Pergamon. Ithaca, New York: Cornell University Press; London: Cornell University Press Ltd. .
 Kosmetatou, Elizabeth (2003) "The Attalids of Pergamon," in Andrew Erskine, ed., A Companion to the Hellenistic World. Oxford: Blackwell: pp. 159–174. . text
Nelson, T.J. (2020) ‘Nicander’s Hymn to Attalus: Pergamene Panegyric’, CCJ 66, 182–202.
Simon Hornblower and Tony Spawforth, Who's Who (Classical World), pg. 61.

Kings of Pergamon
People from Pergamon
Ancient Greek botanists
Ancient Greek writers
2nd-century BC Greek people
2nd-century BC rulers in Asia
Year of birth unknown
133 BC deaths